Isotta Brembati (c. 1530 – February 24, 1586), also known as Isotta Brembati Grumelli, was an Italian poet and countess.

Biography 

Born in Bergamo in 1530 to Isotta Ludovico and Lucas Brembati, Brembati was fluent in Greek, Latin, French, Spanish, and Italian. Initially married to Count Lecio Secco d'Aragona di Calcio, she remarried to Gian Gerolamo Grumelli in 1561. Brembati and Grumelli gained significant local influence as a couple and were painted twice by Giovanni Battista Moroni.

Legacy
Brembati gained widespread acclaim for her poetry. After her death in 1586, a book of poems titled Rime funerali di diversi illustri ingegni composte in volgare et latina favella in morte della molto illustre signora Isotta Brembati-Grumelli was published to commemorate her.

References 

16th-century Italian poets
Italian women poets
Writers from Bergamo
16th-century Italian women writers
1530 births
1586 deaths